Hesar-e Shaveh (also Romanized as Ḩeşār-e Shāveh and Ḩeşār Shāveh) is a village in Nabovat Rural District, in the Central District of Eyvan County, Ilam Province, Iran. At the 2006 census, its population was 131, in 25 families. The village is populated by Kurds.

References 

Populated places in Eyvan County
Kurdish settlements in Ilam Province